David James (9 September 1917 – 12 December 1981) was a Welsh professional footballer who played as a centre forward.

Career
Born in Swansea, James signed for Bradford City in May 1935 from Leeds United. During his time with Bradford City he made five appearances in the Football League. He left the club in July 1937 to play for Mossley. He transferred to Chelsea for £200 in April 1938.

He joined Swansea Town in May 1947, helping them win the 1947 London Combination Cup final. He scored on his Football League debut for the club at Bristol City four months later. He netted seven goals in 12 League games before joining Haverfordwest County in August 1948 where he became captain, then manager.

Sources

References

1917 births
1981 deaths
Welsh footballers
Leeds United F.C. players
Bradford City A.F.C. players
Mossley A.F.C. players
English Football League players
Association football forwards
Chelsea F.C. players
Swansea City A.F.C. players
Haverfordwest County A.F.C. managers
Haverfordwest County A.F.C. players
Welsh football managers
Footballers from Swansea